Valsella is a genus of fungi within the family Valsaceae.

References

Sordariomycetes